The Last Remake of Beau Geste is a 1977 American historical comedy film. It stars and was also directed and co-written by Marty Feldman.  It is a satire loosely based on the 1924 novel Beau Geste, a frequently-filmed story of brothers and their adventures in the French Foreign Legion.  The humor is based heavily upon wordplay and absurdity.  Feldman plays Digby Geste, the awkward and clumsy "identical twin" brother of Michael York's Beau, the dignified, aristocratic swashbuckler.

It was the feature film directorial debut of Feldman. He subsequently went on to direct In God We Tru$t (1980).

Plot 
Spoofing the classic Beau Geste and a number of other desert motion pictures, the film's plotline revolves around the heroic Beau Geste (York) and his "identical twin brother" Digby's (Feldman) misadventures in the French Foreign Legion out in the Sahara, and the disappearance of the family sapphire, sought after by their money-hungry stepmother and the sadistic Sergeant Markov (Ustinov).

Cast
 Marty Feldman as Digby Geste
 Michael York as Beau Geste
 Ann-Margret as Flavia Geste
 Peter Ustinov as the brutal Sergeant Markov
 Sinéad Cusack as sister Isabel Geste
 Trevor Howard as Sir Hector
 Spike Milligan as Crumble the Butler
 Burt Kwouk as Father Shapiro
 James Earl Jones as Arab Chief
 Avery Schreiber as Arab Chieftain / Used Camel Salesman
 Terry-Thomas as Warden
 Henry Gibson as General Pecheur
 Roy Kinnear as Corporal Boldini
 Irene Handl as Miss Wormwood
 Hugh Griffith as Judge
 Stephen Lewis as Henshaw
 Ed McMahon as Arab Horseman
 Michael McConkey as young Digby
 Roland MacLeod as Dr. Crippen
 Martin Snaric as Valentino

Production

Development
Feldman had appeared in two film spoofs made by actor-writer-directors, Mel Brooks' Young Frankenstein and Gene Wilder's The Adventure of Sherlock Holmes' Smarter Brother. In 1976, Feldman signed with Universal Pictures for a five picture deal to direct, write, and act in films, beginning with The Last Remake of Beau Geste.

Feldman states in eyE Marty, his posthumously published autobiography, that when he originally suggested a film called The Last Remake of Beau Geste to Universal, he was not only joking but also "thinking of the wrong foreign-legion film. The film I was thinking about was called The Four Feathers."

"We see Marty as a triple threat artist," said a Universal spokesman. "Marty is like a throwback to the old silent comics who could do it all. It doesn't matter that he's British because physical gags travel. That's why he has a major future ahead of him and why we've made a major, major investment in Marty at Universal."

"Everybody has a five picture deal," said Feldman. "Until the first picture bombs. Then they have a no picture deal."

Feldman called it a "broad comic parody". He wrote it during and after the making of Sherlock Holmes.

"There's the whole idea of dying nobly, a bull---- idea. The film will poke fun at the way people think about war, dying for flags instead of people, heroism. There is a serious element in all comedy... the two overlap and merge. I see life as absurd and there's dignity in the absurd. Keaton had it. Chaplin had it. Woody Allen and Lenny Bruce. What we're saying about life is laugh."

"I didn't want to work with clowns but actors who can clown," he said.

Shooting
Filming began 30 August 1976.

The film was shot on location in Spain, and in Ireland at Ardmore Studios in Bray, and on location at Kilmainham Gaol in Dublin and Adare Manor near Limerick.

Filming was difficult, with the shoot plagued by excessive rain in Madrid. Feldman also  fell ill with chicken pox and production was suspended while he went away to recover.

The film went over budget and over schedule.

After completing his cut of the film, Universal sent Feldman on a two-week "working vacation." While he was gone, Universal recut the film and had  John Morris compose a new score. Feldman's friend Alan Spencer said the two cuts were markedly different - Feldman's was more surreal and Pythonesque, whereas Universal's told a more conventional story. The Universal version ended with a scene where Feldman's began, because his was told in flashback. Spencer says both versions were tested before audiences, and Feldman's version tested better, but Universal ultimately released their cut of the film.

Reception 
On Rotten Tomatoes the film has an approval rating of 42% based on 12 reviews.

Vincent Canby of The New York Times wrote a positive review of the film, describing it as having "a whole range of jokes that are funny primarily because they are in absolutely terrible taste." Gene Siskel of the Chicago Tribune gave the film 2.5 stars out of 4 and called it "only a slightly above-average comedy. It starts out with a number of funny sequences, and Feldman is funny-looking for a few minutes. But I don't find him interesting enough or funny enough or likable enough to carry an entire movie." Arthur D. Murphy of Variety wrote that the film "emerges as an often hilarious, if uneven, spoof of Foreign Legion films ... An excellent cast, top to bottom, gets the most out of the stronger scenes, and carries the weaker ones." Charles Champlin of the Los Angeles Times wrote, "There are too few jokes and rapturous inventions to sustain even the movie's brief 85 minutes, some of those that exist are strained too hard and some should have been dropped after the first draft. It gets to be a long siege at the fort." Gary Arnold of The Washington Post wrote, "Although there's no difference in the games they like to play, Feldman seems a shaky, bush-league terrible joker compared to a prodigal, big-league terrible joker like [Mel] Brooks ... Feldman often seems uncertain about whether a sight gag will pay off, so to reassure himself, he'll run it into the ground." Penelope Gilliatt of The New Yorker called the film "recklessly funny" and "a hilarious exercise in taste run amok." Tom Milne of The Monthly Film Bulletin declared it "a ragbag of a film which looks like nothing so much as a Monty Python extravaganza in which inspiration has run dry and the comic timing gone sadly awry."

The film was described as a "surprise hit" and Feldman was able to direct a second film for Universal, In God We Tru$t, released in 1980.

Release 
Feldman was angry with Universal for distributing their recut of the film.  Attempts have been made since his death in 1982 to have the director's cut released, but so far  have been unsuccessful. According to Michael York, "Marty's version was much funnier." The film was released on DVD in the US on January 11, 2010 as part of the Universal Vault Series of DVD-on-Demand titles, sold by Amazon.com, in the UK, the film was released through Second Sight Films on January 24, 2011.

Kino Lorber released a Blu-ray special edition of "The Last Remake of Beau Geste"  featuring a commentary from Alan Spencer that verbally recreates Feldman's cut.

References

External links
 
 

1977 films
1970s parody films
American parody films
Films based on British novels
Films directed by Marty Feldman
Films scored by John Morris
Films about the French Foreign Legion
Universal Pictures films
Films set in deserts
Remakes of American films
1977 directorial debut films
1977 comedy films
1970s historical comedy films
1970s English-language films
1970s American films